Manuel Alcalde Fornieles (December 31, 1956 – April 23, 2004) was a male race walker from Spain. He represented his native country twice at the Olympic Games: 1984 and 1988. He was born and died in Guadix, Granada.

Achievements

References

1956 births
2004 deaths
Spanish male racewalkers
Athletes (track and field) at the 1984 Summer Olympics
Athletes (track and field) at the 1988 Summer Olympics
Olympic athletes of Spain
People from Guadix
Sportspeople from the Province of Granada